Yoraperla is a genus of roach-like stoneflies in the family Peltoperlidae. There are about eight described species in Yoraperla.

Species
These eight species belong to the genus Yoraperla:
 Yoraperla altaica Devyatkov, 2003
 Yoraperla brevis (Banks, 1907)
 Yoraperla han Stark & Nelson, 1994
 Yoraperla mariana (Ricker, 1943) (brown roachfly)
 Yoraperla nigrisoma (Banks, 1948) (black roachfly)
 Yoraperla siletz Stark & Nelson, 1994
 Yoraperla uchidai Stark & Nelson, 1994
 Yoraperla uenoi (Kohno, 1946)

References

Further reading

 
 

Plecoptera
Articles created by Qbugbot